The 2022 Idaho State Bengals football team represented Idaho State University in the Big Sky Conference during the 2022 NCAA Division I FCS football season. In their only season under head coach Charlie Ragle, the Bengals were 1–10 (1–7 in Big Sky, last) and played their home games on campus at Holt Arena in Pocatello, Idaho.

Hired in December 2021, Ragle was previously the special teams coach at California of the Pac-12 Conference. After the season, he resigned in late November 2022 to join the staff at Arizona State.

Previous season
The Bengals finished the 2021 season at 1–10 (1–7 in Big Sky, twelfth).

Preseason

Polls
On July 25, 2022, during the virtual Big Sky Kickoff, the Bengals were predicted to finish in a tie for eleventh in the Big Sky by the coaches and last by the media.

Preseason All–Big Sky team
The Bengals did not have any players selected to the preseason all-Big Sky team.

Schedule

Game summaries

at UNLV

at San Diego State

Central Arkansas

at Northern Colorado

No. 3 Montana

at No. 4 Montana State

Cal Poly

Northern Arizona

at UC Davis

at No. 7 Weber State

No. 21т Idaho

References

Idaho State
Idaho State Bengals football seasons
Idaho State Bengals football